Thank Christ for the Bomb is the third studio album recorded by The Groundhogs, originally released by Liberty Records in 1970. It was engineered by Martin Birch, who had previously worked on albums by Deep Purple, Jeff Beck, Fleetwood Mac and Peter Green. It entered the UK Melody Maker album charts at number 27 on 20 June 1970, and had a total of 3 entries in that chart.

Artwork
The image of Pete Cruickshank on the left of the cover is adapted from photograph Q 1 in the Imperial War Museum's photograph archive.

Track listing
All tracks composed by Tony McPhee

  "Strange Town" – 4:16
  "Darkness Is No Friend" – 2:43
  "Soldier" – 4:51
  "Thank Christ for the Bomb" – 7:15
  "Ship on the Ocean" – 3:27
  "Garden" – 5:19
  "Status People" – 3:32
  "Rich Man, Poor Man" – 3:25
  "Eccentric Man" – 4:53

2003 CD reissue bonus tracks (live versions)

  "Garden" – 3:35
  "Eccentric Man" – 5:01
  "Soldier" – 15:03

Personnel
The Groundhogs
Tony McPhee – guitars, vocals
Peter Cruickshank – bass
Ken Pustelnik – drums
Technical
Martin Birch – engineer
Alan Tanner – artwork

References

1970 albums
The Groundhogs albums
Liberty Records albums
Fire Records (UK) albums